Blue Chip is the third album by Acoustic Alchemy, released under the MCA Master Series label in 1989, and again under GRP in 1996.

The album presented an experiment with pop music in the band's signature style, using strong, memorable melody lines.

The most successful track here is "Catalina Kiss", the album opener and a longstanding live favourite. Using a shuffle rhythm, the track calls upon the saxophone for embellishments, whilst tonal harmonies between the two guitars evoke a strong melody. JazzTrax presenter Art Good suggested that the track was inspired by an appearance by the band at the 1988 Catalina Island Jazz Festival.

Track listing

Personnel 

  – Percussion
 Rainer Bruninghaus – Piano, Keyboards
 Greg Carmichael – Guitar
 Klaus Genuit – Percussion, Engineer
 John Parsons – Guitar, Guitar (Electric), Producer
 Bert Smaak – Percussion, Drums, Programming
 Klaus Sperber – Bass
 Nick Webb – Guitar
 Karl Heinz Wiberny – Saxophone, Woodwind

References

Acoustic Alchemy albums
GRP Records albums
1989 albums
MCA Records albums